Casey Ellison (born March 2, 1976) is a former American child actor best known for his role as Allen Anderson on Punky Brewster.  In 1986 he left the show because he was disgruntled.

Career 
Ellison had a recurring minor role on Mr. Belvedere, and has also guest starred on episodes of Newhart, 21 Jump Street, and The Wonder Years. His most recent acting role was in the 2002 horror film Head Hunter.

Filmography

Award nominations

References

External links 
 

1976 births
20th-century American male actors
21st-century American male actors
American male child actors
American male film actors
American male television actors
American male voice actors
Living people